Bulgaria liberated itself from the Ottoman Empire in 1878 and, although it remained de jure autonomous until the proclamation of full independence in 1908, it acted as a de facto independent country. From 1879, stamps were issued in Bulgarian Cyrillic script and some of the stamps—such as those issued in 1901—commemorated the 25th anniversary of the April Uprising against the Turks and, in 1902, celebrated the 25th anniversary of the Battle of Shipka. Bulgaria become a de jure independent state in 1908, even though early stamps issued in the 1910s still depicted Tsar Ferdinand and Tsar Boris III.

See also 
 Bulgarian Posts
Union of the Bulgarian Philatelists
 List of fish on stamps of Bulgaria
 Postage stamps and postal history of Eastern Rumelia

References

External links

Communications in Bulgaria
Philately of Bulgaria